Eaton is a northeastern suburb of Bunbury, Western Australia, 7 km from the centre of Bunbury on the south shore of the Collie River. Its local government area is the Shire of Dardanup, and the offices for the Shire are located within the suburb. Eaton contains a state high school, Eaton Community College, and two state primary schools, Eaton and Glen Huon. The suburb also contains a shopping centre called Eaton Fair, as well as a sporting complex led by Eaton Recreation Centre.

References

Suburbs of Bunbury, Western Australia